Jakob Erbar (8 February 1878 – 7 January 1935) was a German professor of graphic design and a type designer.  Erbar trained as a typesetter for the Dumont-Schauberg Printing Works before studying under Fritz Helmut Ehmcke and Anna Simons.  Erbar went on to teach in 1908 at the Städtischen Berufsschule and from 1919 to his death at the Kölner Werkschule.  His seminal Erbar series was one of the first geometric sans-serif typefaces, predating both Paul Renner's Futura and Rudolf Koch's Kabel by some five years.

Typefaces

Foundry types produced by Jakob Erbar:

External links
Font Designer - Jakob Erbar
MyFonts – Jakob Erbar

References
Friedl, Ott, and Stein, Typography: an Encyclopedic Survey of Type Design and Techniques Throughout History. Black Dog & Levinthal Publishers: 1998. .
Jaspert, W. Pincus, W. Turner Berry and A.F. Johnson. The Encyclopedia of Type Faces. Blandford Press Lts.: 1953, 1983. .

German graphic designers
German typographers and type designers
1878 births
1935 deaths